Benxilu Station, literally the Benxi Road Station in English, is a station on Line 1 of the Tianjin Metro. It began operations on June 12, 2006.

References

Railway stations in Tianjin
Railway stations in China opened in 2006
Tianjin Metro stations